Eurycea subfluvicola, commonly known as the Ouachita streambed salamander, is a species of salamanders found within the Slunger creek valley in Lake Catherine State Park, Arkansas.  The species is paedomorphic. The species' scientific name derives from "sub" (below), "fluvius" (stream), and "colo" (to dwell).

References

Amphibians described in 2014
Endemic fauna of Arkansas
Eurycea
Lake Catherine State Park